The 1975 FIBA Europe Under-16 Championship (known at that time as 1975 European Championship for Cadets) was the third edition of the FIBA Europe Under-16 Championship. The cities of Athens and Thessaloniki, in Greece, hosted the tournament. The Soviet Union won their second title in a row and became the most winning country in the tournament.

Teams

Preliminary round
The twenty teams were allocated in four groups (two groups of four teams each and two groups of six teams each).

Group A

Group B

Group C

Group D

Knockout stage

19th–20th playoffs

17th–18th playoffs

9th–12th playoffs

13th–16th playoffs

Championship

5th–8th playoffs

Final standings

References
FIBA Archive
FIBA Europe Archive

FIBA U16 European Championship
1975–76 in European basketball
1975 in Greek sport
International youth basketball competitions hosted by Greece